SS Pollux may refer to:

SS Pollux, a whaler and exploration ship later renamed 
, a Swedish steamer
, a United States Navy cargo ship in commission from 3 to 24 April 1918 known both before and after her U.S. Navy service as SS Pollux
, ex-T-AK-290, a United States Navy vehicle cargo ship in non-commissioned Military Sealift Command service from 1981 to 2007, known since her transfer to the Ready Reserve Force in 2008 as SS Pollux

See also

Ship names